Milton Robert Carr, commonly known as Bob Carr, (born March 27, 1943) is an American lawyer, academic, and politician from the U.S. state of Michigan.

Carr served in the U.S. House of Representatives from Michigan's 6th and 8th congressional districts for eight terms and one term, respectively. Carr's career in the U.S. House had a two-year hiatus in which he had lost his seat to Jim Dunn in 1980 before being reelected to Congress in 1982.

Following his career in Congress, Carr became of counsel at a Washington, D.C.-based communications law firm in 2005. He is involved with the United States Association of Former Members of Congress, where he serves on the board of directors.

Biography
Carr was born in Janesville, Wisconsin, and was educated in public schools of Janesville. He received a B.S. from the University of Wisconsin–Madison, Madison in 1965 and a J.D. from the University of Wisconsin Law School in 1968. He did graduate work at Michigan State University in East Lansing, Michigan, and was admitted to the Wisconsin bar in 1968 and to the Michigan bar in 1969. He commenced practice in Lansing, Michigan, and served as Michigan assistant attorney general, 1970–1972.

U.S. House career
Carr first ran as a Democrat for Michigan's 6th congressional district in 1972, facing eight-term Republican incumbent Charles E. Chamberlain. Chamberlain only narrowly defeated Carr by 97,666 votes (50.68%) to 95,029 (49.32%) in what was otherwise a strong Republican year, which persuaded Chamberlain to retire in 1974, when he was succeeded by Carr.

Carr represented the district in the U.S. House for the 94th and to the two succeeding Congresses, serving from January 3, 1975, to January 3, 1981. He was an unsuccessful candidate for re-election in 1980 to the 97th Congress, being defeated by James Whitney Dunn. Two years later, he defeated Dunn and was elected to the 98th and subsequently re-elected to the five succeeding Congresses, serving from January 3, 1983, to January 3, 1995. The last two years he represented Michigan's 8th congressional district after the redistricting in 1993. He was not a candidate for re-election in 1994, but was an unsuccessful candidate for election to the United States Senate, losing to Spencer Abraham.

Carr began his career in Congress with a reputation as a rebel and self-described "angry young man." Shortly after his election in 1974, he called for the resignation of Democratic U.S. House Speaker Carl Albert. Carr later expressed public regret for his early attacks on the Congressional leadership and called them "sheer, naive stupidity." After taking office in 1975 Carr was named to the House Armed Services Committee, where he focused his attention on ending U.S. involvement in the war in Southeast Asia. On March 12, 1975, with the influential help of House Democratic Caucus Chairman Phillip Burton, Carr authored a resolution that passed the Caucus by 189-49 effectively cutting off further military assistance to South Vietnam or to Cambodia in fiscal year 1975.

After losing and regaining his seat in the 1980 and 1982 elections, respectively, he was named to the House Committee on Appropriations, lowered his profile and focused his attention on budget and spending issues. He became chairman of the Subcommittee on Transportation, where he pioneered the use of economic-based criteria and ranks to earmarks requested by members of Congress for their districts.

Carr gave up his seat in the House to run for Senate in 1994, winning the Democratic primary but losing to Republican Spencer Abraham in the general election.

Later career
From 1995 to 2006 Carr worked as a consultant in international business and government affairs. From 2005 to 2012 he was Of Counsel at Dow Lohnes PLLC, a communications law firm in Washington, D.C.

In 2012 Carr became Adjunct Professor in The Graduate School of Political Management at George Washington University and adjunct faculty at Brookings Institution's Brookings Executive Education where he lectures on Congressional Appropriations, Authorization and Budgeting. He also assists in the Brookings Legislative Fellows program. In 2007 Carr was diagnosed with multiple myeloma and successfully underwent an autologous stem cell transplant at the Dana–Farber Cancer Institute in 2008. Since then he has been involved advocating for funding for cancer research and was featured in the Cancer Progress Report 2012.

He is a member of the board of directors of the United States Association of Former Members of Congress. Carr is also a member of the ReFormers Caucus of Issue One.
Divorced, he has one child, Alexandra Anne, a stepdaughter Jennifer Smith McCloskey, and a stepson Christopher Smith McCloskey.

References

External links

 
The Political Graveyard

American lobbyists
Baptists from Michigan
Politicians from Janesville, Wisconsin
1943 births
Living people
People with multiple myeloma
Democratic Party members of the United States House of Representatives from Michigan
University of Wisconsin–Madison alumni
University of Wisconsin Law School alumni
Michigan State University alumni
George Washington University faculty
Members of Congress who became lobbyists